Blue Mosque may refer to:

Buildings 
 Blue Mosque, Istanbul, Turkey
 Blue Mosque, Yerevan, Armenia
 Blue Mosque, Tabriz, Iran
 Blue Mosque (Amsterdam), Netherlands
 Great Mosque of Herat, Afghanistan
 Blue Mosque (Mazar-i-Sharif), Mazari Sharif, Afghanistan
Bibi-Khanym Mosque, Samarkand, Uzbekistan
 Ajdarbey Mosque, Baku, Azerbaijan
 Aqsunqur Mosque, Egypt
 King Abdullah I Mosque, Amman, Jordan
 Mohammad Al-Amin Mosque, Beirut, Lebanon
Shah Mosque, Isfahan, Iran
 Sultan Salahuddin Abdul Aziz Mosque, Shah Alam, Malaysia
 An-Nasr Mosque, Nablus, West Bank

Other uses
 Blue Mosque a 1994 album by album by Muslimgauze

Mosque disambiguation pages